Ananthanallur  is a village in the Mayiladuthurai taluk of Mayiladuthurai district, Tamil Nadu, India.Ananthanallur village has higher literacy rate compared to Tamil Nadu.

Demographics 

 census, Ananthanallur had a total population of 1295 with 642 males and 653 females. The sex ratio was 1017. The literacy rate was 73.25.

References 

 

Villages in Mayiladuthurai district